Lovat may refer to:

 A colour of Scottish tweed
 River Lovat, a river in England
 Lovat (river), a river in Belarus and Russia
 Lord Lovat, a title in the Peerage of Scotland
 Lovat Scouts, British Army unit
 Lovat Shinty Club, a shinty club from Kiltarlity, Scotland
 LOVAT Inc., a Canadian company which manufactures and markets tunnel boring machines (TBMs)